Carlo Domenico Carli (born 6 April 1960) is an Australian politician, and president of association football (soccer) Brunswick Zebras Football Club. He was a Labor Party member of the Victorian Legislative Assembly from 1994 to 2010, representing the electorate of Brunswick.

Early life

Carlo was born in Melbourne in 1960. His parents came to Australia from Italy after WWII. They come from Vicenza, in the old Venetian republic and lived first in Carlton and later in Coburg. Carlo worked alongside his father at General Motors during his student years. After matriculating at Newlands High School, Carlo went on to study politics and languages at University of Melbourne. As well as developing his already keen interest in politics. From 1979–80, he was the Assistant Secretary of the Melbourne University Student Representative Council. Carlo used his university years to convert his knowledge of Venetian dialect to standard Italian, and to learn Spanish. He then completed a Masters thesis for the Masters for Urban Planning on the medium-density housing boom.

Political career

Carli was first elected in May 1994, to the then seat of Coburg. He succeeded long-standing Labor MP Tom Roper who had been the Victorian Treasurer and a senior Minister in the Cain and Kirner governments. He was first elected to the Labor frontbench in 1996. From October to December 1999 he was Parliamentary Secretary for Multicultural Affairs, before moving to Infrastructure under the then state Minister for Transport, Peter Batchelor. After the 2006 State Election he stepped down from the frontbench. On 3 June 2008 he announced his intention to retire from Parliament at the 2010 State Election.

Personal life

His work background includes the trade union movement, local, State and Federal government, including a stint as Ministerial Adviser in Housing in the twilight months of the Kirner government. He is married to Siobhan Hannan and has three children.

Notes
  Carlo Carli's curriculum vitae
  Retirement Announcement

References

External links
 Carlo Carli's website

1960 births
Australian Labor Party members of the Parliament of Victoria
Living people
Members of the Victorian Legislative Assembly
21st-century Australian politicians